Gangnam or Kangnam may refer to:

Places

Stations

Other uses

See also
 "Gangnam Style", a 2012 song by PSY in 2012
 Han River (Korea)
 Jiangnan (disambiguation)